Mine is a 1983 Turkish drama film directed by Atıf Yılmaz. It was entered into the 14th Moscow International Film Festival.

Cast
 Türkan Soray as Mine
 Cihan Ünal as Ilhan
 Hümeyra as Perihan
 Kerim Afsar as Doctor
 Celile Toyon Uysal

References

External links
 

1983 films
1983 drama films
Turkish drama films
1980s Turkish-language films